Bull Mountain, an officially unnamed summit in northern Utah, United States, has an elevation of . It is the highest point in the Raft River Mountains and Box Elder County.

Description
The mountain is located southeast of Yost, west of Snowville and south of Malta, Idaho in the Raft River Division of the Minidoka Ranger District of Sawtooth National Forest.

The northern slopes of Bull Mountain are drained by tributaries of the Raft River, a tributary of the Snake River, and the southern slopes drain into the Great Salt Lake. The peak can be reached via a long trail from the east or a 4-wheel drive road from the west. The summit is very broad, but views from the mountain can encompass the Albion, Black Pine, and Wasatch mountains.

See also

 List of mountains in Utah

References

External links

  Official Site.

Mountains of Utah
Mountains of Box Elder County, Utah
Sawtooth National Forest